Evaldo Rosa da Silva (born 18 October 1958) is a Brazilian sprinter. He competed in the men's 400 metres at the 1984 Summer Olympics.

References

1958 births
Living people
Athletes (track and field) at the 1984 Summer Olympics
Brazilian male sprinters
Olympic athletes of Brazil
Place of birth missing (living people)
Pan American Games medalists in athletics (track and field)
Pan American Games silver medalists for Brazil
Athletes (track and field) at the 1983 Pan American Games
Medalists at the 1983 Pan American Games
20th-century Brazilian people